K30MF-D, virtual and UHF digital channel 30, is a defunct low-powered television station licensed to Jonesboro, Arkansas, United States. Owned by DTV America Corporation and operated by HC2 Holdings, the station's transmitter was located in Walnut Ridge, Arkansas.

History 
The station's construction permit was granted to DTV America by the Federal Communications Commission (FCC) in September 2011.

In 2015, the MyNetworkTV website listed K30MF-D to become the MyNetworkTV affiliate for the Jonesboro area in the near future; however, the addition of the programming service to KJNB-LD3 and KJNE-LD3 on September 3, 2018 meant that Waypoint Media, LLC (not DTV America Corporation/HC2 Holdings) picked up the MyNetworkTV affiliation in the Jonesboro market. In August 2015, KJNB-LD signed on to become Fox and CBS affiliates, with KJNE-LD serving as a translator of that station since August 2015 (that has since been upgraded into digital). With CBS, Fox and MyNetworkTV available on KJNB-LD/KJNE-LD and ABC, NBC, and CW coming from KAIT, Jonesboro now offered all four major television networks, as well as The CW and the MyNetworkTV programming services. Prior to September 1, 2018, WLMT served as the default over-the-air CW affiliate, while prior to September 3, 2018, Memphis, Tennessee's KPMF-LD, along with Paducah, Kentucky's WDKA, served as the default MyNetworkTV affiliates in Jonesboro; because KJNB-LD3 and KJNE-LD3, as of the fall 2018 season, provided MyNetworkTV programming, K30MF-D was probably to air the Antenna TV schedule full-time.

The station's license was cancelled by the FCC on August 24, 2020.

References

External links

DTV America
RECNet CDBS Query on K30MF-D

30MF-D
Low-power television stations in the United States
Television channels and stations established in 2015
2015 establishments in Arkansas
Innovate Corp.
Television channels and stations disestablished in 2020
2020 disestablishments in Arkansas
Defunct television stations in the United States
30MF-D